Eastover may refer to:

Places in the United Kingdom 

 Eastover, Somerset, an area of Bridgwater

Places in the United States 
Eastover Surry County, Virginia
Eastover (Manalapan, Florida)
Eastover Country Club, New Orleans, LA
Eastover, North Carolina
Eastover (Salisbury, North Carolina), listed on the National Register of Historic Places in Rowan County, North Carolina
Eastover, South Carolina